The Chyornaya Kalitva or Chernaya Kalitva ("Black Kalitva") is a river in the Belgorod and Voronezh regions in Russia. It is a right, east-flowing, tributary of Don River. It enters the Don about 185km south of Voronezh.

About 225km south the Belaya (White) Kalitva flows south to join the Donets at the town of Belaya Kalitva.

References

Rivers of Belgorod Oblast
Rivers of Voronezh Oblast